Rob Malcolm is a black British journalist for WNYW. Joining the station in the beginning of 2007, Malcolm is a former football player. He replaced James Ford, now with WPIX-TV, the CW affiliate in New York.

Malcolm's first job in journalism was at CKRY radio. He spent a year reporting on sports in Toronto before finding a sports position in Detroit.

Starting on the weekend of August 11, 2007, Malcolm was one of many to replace Reid Lamberty as presenter on the weekend editions of FOX 5 News in New York. Lamberty has been promoted to weekday mornings with the Good Day New York team.

References

External links
Rob Malcolm biography

Living people
Year of birth missing (living people)
New York (state) television reporters